Linuchidae is a family of crown jellyfish.

Species

Linuche
Linuche aquila
Thimble jellyfish (Linuche unguiculata)

External links

 
Taxa named by Ernst Haeckel
Cnidarian families
Coronatae